Las modelos is a Mexican telenovela produced by Ernesto Alonso for Teleprogramas Acapulco, SA in 1963.

Cast 
Ariadna Welter
Rita Macedo
Alma Delia Fuentes
Graciela Lara
Fanny Schiller

References

External links 

Mexican telenovelas
1963 telenovelas
Televisa telenovelas
1963 Mexican television series debuts
1963 Mexican television series endings
Spanish-language telenovelas